"Two Is A Couple" is a song written by Ike Turner. It was recorded and released by R&B duo Ike & Tina Turner in 1965.

Background and release 
After three years with Sue Records, Ike & Tina Turner began recording on Ike Turner's Sonja label in 1963. They released numerous singles on various labels between 1964 and 1965 before re-signing to Sue in 1965. Their first record under the new contract was "Two Is A Couple," released as a non-album track in October 1965. It was written and produced by Ike Turner. The single peaked at No. 15 on the Cash Box R&B chart. Tina Turner performed the song on the TV program Where the Action Is. A different version of "Two Is A Couple" appeared on the album Airwaves (United Artists, 1978). The song later appeared on the compilation album The Ike & Tina Turner Story: 1960–1975 (Time Life, 2007).

Critical reception 

The single was chosen as Cash Box's Pick of the Week.

Cash Box (October 16, 1965): "Ike and Tina Turner return to the home of their original hits with this power-packed Sue release dubbed 'Two Is A Couple.' The side is a rollicking, fast-moving pop-r&b handclapper about a somewhat jealous lass who doesn't want any other female messing around with her fella. 'Tin Top House' is a lyrical, lush-sounding blues weeper with a nostalgic years-back sound."

Record World (October 16, 1965): "Couple will escort 'Couple' far and Sue folk must be happy to have them back aboard."

Track listing

Chart performance

References 

1965 singles
1965 songs
Ike & Tina Turner songs
Songs written by Ike Turner
Song recordings produced by Ike Turner
Sue Records singles